The following things have been named after Mahatma Gandhi:

Roads
 Mahatma Gandhi Road

Universities, colleges, schools, and research institutes

Universities
 Mahatma Gandhi Central University
 Mahatma Gandhi Kashi Vidyapith, Varanasi
 Gandhigram Rural Institute, Dindigul in Tamil Nadu
 Mahatma Gandhi College
 Mahatma Gandhi University, Kottayam
 Mahatma Gandhi Antarrashtriya Hindi Vishwavidyalaya
 Mahatma Gandhi University, Nalgonda
 Mahatma Gandhi Chitrakoot Gramoday Vishwavidyalaya
 Mahatma Gandhi Institute for Rural Industrialization
 Mahatma Gandhi Institute of Technology, Hyderabad.
 Mahatma Gandhi University, Meghalaya
 MGM Institute of Health Sciences
 Mahatma Gandhi Institute of Education for Peace and Sustainable Development, New Delhi
 Mahatma Gandhi Labour Institute, Gujarat
 Mahatma Gandhi Institute of Rural Energy and Development, Bangalore, Karnataka

Medical Colleges
 Mahatma Gandhi Institute of Medical Sciences
 Mahatma Gandhi Memorial Medical College, Indore 
 Mahatma Gandhi Memorial Medical College, Jamshedpur
 Mahatma Gandhi Medical College & Research Institute
 Gandhi Medical College

Engineering Colleges
 Mahatma Gandhi University college of engineering
 Mahatma Gandhi Institute of Technology
 Mahatma Gandhi Mission's College of Engineering and Technology

Hospitals
 Mahatma Gandhi Memorial Hospital

Foundations
 Mahatma Gandhi National Foundation
 Gandhi Memorial International Foundation
 Mahatma Gandhi Foundation
 Gandhi Vidya Mandir

Arts and Science Colleges
 Mahatma Gandhi National Memorial Trust
 Mahatma Gandhi Government Arts College
 Mahatma Gandhi College, Lakshadweep
 Gandhi Memorial College, Srinagar
 Mahatma Gandhi Memorial College
 Mahatma Gandhi Inter College
 Mahathma Gandhi College, Iritty
 Mahatma Gandhi Government College, Mayabunder

Schools
 Barasat Mahatma Gandhi Memorial High School
 Mahatma Gandhi International School, Pasay
 Mahatma Gandhi International School, Ahmedabad 
 Mahatma Gandhi Memorial High School (Fiji)
 Mahatma Gandhi College, Purulia
 Mahatma Gandhi High School, Sheragada
 Mahatma Gandhi Centenary Vidyalaya

Structures and Places
 Gandhinagar, Gujarat, India
 Gandhidham, Gujarat, India
 Mahatma Gandhi Bus Station, Hyderabad
 Mahatma Gandhi Memorial (Milwaukee)
 Statue of Mahatma Gandhi, Parliament Square 
 Mahatma Gandhi Road metro station (Bangalore)
 Mahatma Gandhi Setu
 Mahatma Gandhi District, Houston
 Mahatma Gandhi Marine National Park
 Gandhi Smriti 
 Mahatma Gandhi Park
 Gandhi Market
 Mahatma Gandhi Road metro station
 National Gandhi Museum
 Gandhi Bhawan, Chandigarh
 Raj Ghat and associated memorials
 Mahatma Gandhi Super Thermal Power Project
 Gandhi Heritage Portal
 Gandhi Memorial Museum, Madurai
 Gandhi Smarak Sangrahalaya
 Gandhi Maidan
 Gandhi Mandapam (Chennai)
 Gandhi Sangrahalaya, Patna
 Mahatma Gandhi Stadium
 Gandhi Promenade
 Kaba Gandhi No Delo
Mahatma Gandhi Square, Kiryat Gat, Israel
Gandhi Square, Johannesburg, South Africa
Gandhi Square, Rivière du Rempart, Mauritius
Gandhi Square, Falcon's Lea Park, Davie, Broward County, Florida, United States
 Gandhi Village, Debe, Trinidad and Tobago

Films
 Gandhi
 Mahatma: Life of Gandhi, 1869–1948
 Lage Raho Munna Bhai
Hey Ram(2000)

Books written on Mahatma Gandhi
Gandhi the Man

National Holiday
 Gandhi Jayanti

Others
 Mahatma Gandhi Series (banknotes)
 Gandhi cap
 India 10 Rupees Mahatma Gandhi postage stamp
 Mahatma Gandhi Pravasi Suraksha Yojana 
 Gandhi Peace Award
 120461 Gandhi, a Florian asteroid named in his honor in September 2020

Awards
 Gandhi Peace Prize

References

Lists of things named after Indian politicians